Chester Stephen Gladchuk Sr. (April 4, 1917 – September 4, 1967) was an American football center who played professionally in the National Football League (NFL) for the New York Giants.  He played college football at Boston College and was selected as a first-team All-American by the Associated Press in 1940.  He was drafted in the second round of the 1941 NFL Draft by the Pittsburgh Steelers. After playing seven seasons for the New York Giants and after taking a season off, Gladchuk joined the Montreal Alouettes of the Canadian Football League in 1949, played a full 12-game season, and helped win the Larks first Grey Cup.  Gladchuk was elected to the College Football Hall of Fame in 1975.

References

External links
 

 

1917 births
1967 deaths
American football centers
Boston College Eagles football players
Bridgeport Purple Knights football coaches
Montreal Alouettes players
New York Giants players
College Football Hall of Fame inductees
Sportspeople from Bridgeport, Connecticut
Coaches of American football from Connecticut
Players of American football from Connecticut